Trond Dennis Widgren (born 28 March 1994) is a Swedish footballer who plays as a left back for IK Sirius in Allsvenskan.

Club career

Östersunds FK
Widgren started to play football at IFK Östersund, before moving to other local club Östersunds FK at age 14. He made his debut for their senior team in 2010.

During Widgren's time at the club, Östersund won several promotions from Division 2, Sweden's fourth tier, to Allsvenskan, the highest division. He was a key player for long-time manager Graham Potter's side between 2010 and 2018, also making several continental appearances in the Europa League.

Widgren was a part of the Östersund side that won Svenska Cupen in 2017, the first domestic title in the club's history.

Hammarby IF
On 2 January 2019, Widgren moved on a free transfer to fellow Allsvenskan club Hammarby IF, singing a three and a half-year contract. He made 25 league appearances during his first season, as the club finished 3rd in the table.

On 30 May 2021, Widgren won the 2020–21 Svenska Cupen with Hammarby through a 5–4 win on penalties (0–0 after full-time) against BK Häcken in the final.

On 13 July 2021, Widgren was sent on loan for the remainder of the year to fellow Allsvenskan club IK Sirius. Making 18 league appearances, Widgren helped the club avoid relegation by finishing in 11th place in the table, before leaving at the end of the season.

IK Sirius
On 22 July 2022, Widgren transferred to IK Sirius on a permanent deal, signing a three and a half-year contract.

International career
Between 2011 and 2013, Widgren won three caps for the Swedish U19 national team. He was the first player ever from Östersunds FK to feature in a domestic national team.

Personal life
Widgren was born in Östersund to a Swedish mother and a Norwegian father, thus making him eligible for the Norway national team.

Career statistics

Club

Honours
Östersunds FK
 Svenska Cupen: 2016–17

Hammarby IF
 Svenska Cupen: 2020–21

Notes

References

External links

1994 births
Living people
Association football defenders
Östersunds FK players
Hammarby Fotboll players
IK Sirius Fotboll players
Swedish footballers
Sweden youth international footballers
Allsvenskan players
Superettan players
Ettan Fotboll players
Division 2 (Swedish football) players
People from Östersund
Sportspeople from Jämtland County